The 1957 NCAA College Division basketball tournament involved 32 schools playing in a single-elimination tournament to determine the national champion of men's NCAA College Division college basketball as a culmination of the 1956-57 NCAA College Division men's basketball season. This was the first College Division men's basketball tournament and it was won by Wheaton College. Wheaton's Mel Peterson was named the Most Outstanding Player.

Jackson State, citing policy of the Mississippi Board of Trustees, was compelled to withdraw from the tournament rather than competing in an interracial contest. This would be the only time such an occurrence would directly mar the tournament, and Jackson State themselves would return to the tournament in 1964.

Regionals

East

Northeast

South

Mideast

Great Lakes

Midwest

West

Pacific Coast

*denotes each overtime played
† denotes forfeited game

National Finals - Evansville, Indiana
Location: Roberts Municipal Stadium Host: Evansville College

Third Place - Mount St. Mary's 82, Cal State Los Angeles 72

*denotes each overtime played
† denotes forfeited game

All-tournament team
 Mason Cope (Kentucky Wesleyan)
 Jim Daniels (South Dakota)
 Mel Peterson (Wheaton) 
 Jack Sullivan (Mount Saint Mary's)
 Bob Whitehead (Wheaton)

See also
 1957 NCAA University Division basketball tournament
 1957 National Invitation Tournament
 1957 NAIA Basketball Tournament

References

Sources
 2010 NCAA Men's Basketball Championship Tournament Records and Statistics: Division II men's basketball Championship
 1957 NCAA College Division Men's Basketball Tournament jonfmorse.com

NCAA Division II men's basketball tournament
Tournament
NCAA College Division basketball tournament
NCAA College Division basketball tournament